Chathurangam is a 2002 Indian Malayalam-language political action drama film directed by K. Madhu and written by Babu Janardhanan. It stars Mohanlal, Lalu Alex, Nagma and Navya Nair. The soundtrack was composed by M. G. Sreekumar and Shyam. The plot follows Attiprackal Jimmy, a politician who aspires to become an MLA with the support of minister Kora. The film was released on 20 December 2002 and was the most anticipated Christmas release. Despite the hype, the movie failed commercially. The main reason cited for the failure was the existing Narasimham (film) hangover and the audience couldn't relate to Mohanlal donning the life of a common politician. Over the years, the movie has attained a cult status and is still widely watched in television.

Plot 

The story is set in Kottayam. Atiprackal Jimmy Jacob is everyone's favourite. Attuprakkal Jimmy is a wrestler and do-gooder at the college level. Seeing his all round abilities and popularity, a minister Kora who runs the KSB party, makes him the college chairman. And later he is made the Kottayam district secretary of his party.

Jimmy becomes the right hand man of Kora in his fight against minister Poulose but in the process creates new enemies like the IPS officer Nayana. But soon Poulose and Kora bury their hatchet and join hands. This makes Jimmy unhappy and he is left out. Later Kora frames Jimmy in a murder case.

Cast 

 Mohanlal as Attipraickal Jimmy Jacob alias jimmy
 Lalu Alex as Abkari Methikkalam Thommichan
 Nagma as SP R.Nayana Pillai IPS
 Anu Anand as Joshy Jacob
 Jagadish as Mathen Chethimattom
 Navya Nair as Sherin Mathew medical student
 Sai Kumar as K. C. Korah, Electricity Minister
 Jagathi Sreekumar as Kochausepp alias Thooval ouseppu
 Vijayaraghavan as P. P. Paulose, Home Minister
 Radhika Menon as Liza Jacob (Jimmy's sister)
 Bindu Panikkar as Annie Alex(Jimmy's sister)
 Manianpilla Raju as Alex (Jimmy's brother-in-law)
 K. P. A. C. Lalitha as Therutha
 Nedumudi Venu as Mathew Varghese (Sherin's father)
 Kollam Thulasi as Prosecution Advocate 
 Baburaj as SI Thankaraj
 Bheeman Raghu as SI Erattupetta Hakkim
 Suresh Krishna as Kozhuvanal Jose
 Jose Pelliserry as Uncle of jimmy
 Sadiq (Indian actor) as District Collector
 Valsala Menon as Sister Theressa
 Augustine as Manamel appa
 Shobha Mohan as Alice wife of Mathew Varghese
 Hariprasad R as Lawyer

Soundtrack 
The film's soundtrack contains eight songs composed by M. G. Sreekumar, with lyrics by S. Ramesan Nair, Gireesh Puthenchery, and Shibu Chakravarthy.

References

External links
 

2002 films
2000s Malayalam-language films
Indian political drama films
Films directed by K. Madhu
Films scored by M. G. Sreekumar
Films scored by Shyam (composer)